Azad Ali Tabassum is a Pakistani politician who was a Member of the Provincial Assembly of the Punjab, from August 2013 to May 2018.

Early life 
He was born on 1 January 1968 in Faisalabad.

Political career

He was elected to the Provincial Assembly of the Punjab as a candidate of Pakistan Muslim League (N) from Constituency PP-51 (Faisalabad-I) in by-polls held in August 2013.

References

Living people
Punjab MPAs 2013–2018
1968 births
Pakistan Muslim League (N) politicians